Oyez (more rarely with the word stress at the beginning) is a traditional interjection said two or three times in succession to introduce the opening of a court of law. The interjection is also traditionally used by town criers to attract the attention of the public to public proclamations.

Until the 18th century, speaking English in an English court of law was not required and one could instead use Law French, a form of French that evolved after the Norman Conquest, when Anglo-Norman became the language of the upper classes in England. Oyez descends from the Anglo-Norman oyez, the plural imperative form of oyer, from French ouïr, "to hear"; thus oyez means "hear ye" and was used as a call for silence and attention. It was common in medieval England, and France.

The term is still in use by the Supreme Court of the United States. At the beginning of each session, the Marshal of the United States Supreme Court strikes a gavel and announces: 

The phrase is also in use in other federal courts, such as the following:
 United States Court of Appeals for the District of Columbia Circuit
 United States Court of Appeals for the Second Circuit
 United States Court of Appeals for the Third Circuit
 United States Court of Appeals for the Seventh Circuit
 United States District Court for the Southern District of Texas
 United States District Court for the Eastern District of Pennsylvania
 United States District Court for the Eastern District of Virginia
 United States District Court for the Eastern District of Louisiana

The phrase is also in use in the state courts of Virginia, North Carolina, and Maryland.

In addition to courts, the word, again repeated three times, is used by the Common Crier of the City of London for all of the city's public proclamations most notably the opening and closing of the Common Halls for the elections of lord mayor and the sheriffs at Guildhall. His other duties include the reading of the proclamation dissolving Parliament from the steps of the Royal Exchange in the United Kingdom. Traditionally, a proclamation is delivered to the Mansion House from the Privy Council Office, at which point it is given to the Common Crier, who proceeds to read it publicly.

See also
 Law French
 French language
 Norman language
 List of French expressions in English
 Jersey Legal French
 Franglais

References

External links

 Sound clips of several bailiffs in North Carolina (NPR.org)
 

Town criers
Court administration
British traditions
Supreme Court of the United States